Kamala Ranathunga (also spelled Ranatunge) (born 19 October 1937) is a Sri Lankan politician and a member of the Parliament of Sri Lanka. She belongs to the Sri Lanka Freedom Party which nominated her on its national list to the Parliament of Sri Lanka.

References

Members of the 14th Parliament of Sri Lanka
United People's Freedom Alliance politicians
1937 births
Sinhalese politicians
Living people
Women legislators in Sri Lanka
21st-century Sri Lankan women politicians